Landstuhl, officially the Sickingen Town of Landstuhl, is a town in the Kaiserslautern district of Rhineland-Palatinate in Germany. It is the seat of Verbandsgemeinde Landstuhl, a kind of municipal association.

History

Early history
The earliest traces of human settlement in Landstuhl date from around 500 BC. The “heathen rock” (Heidenfels) from the Celtic period was a holy site until Roman times, and a Roman settlement dates from the 1st century. About 1152, Emperor Frederick I had Nanstein Castle built on the mountain south of town.

Early Modern period

During the 15th Century, the lords of Sickingen assumed responsibility for Landstuhl and the surrounding area. The most famous member of this dynasty was Franz von Sickingen. He converted the castle – Nanstein Castle, the most visible landmark in Landstuhl and the surrounding area – into a dominating fortress. In August 1522, Sickingen moved to further expand his feudal domains by capturing Trier. After several unsuccessful attempts to lay siege to the city, he withdrew to Nanstein Castle and was subsequently besieged by a coalition of Richard, Archbishop of Trier; Louis V, Elector Palatine; and Philip I, Landgrave of Hesse. During the 1523 siege of Nanstein Castle, Sickingen fell mortally wounded. His sons rebuilt the castle in Renaissance style, but it was largely destroyed by Louis XIV's army during the Rhine campaign of the Nine Years' War.

Politics
Landstuhl's mayor is Ralf Hersina

Economy and infrastructure
Landstuhl is home to Landstuhl Hospital (Kirchberg-Kaserne), also known as Landstuhl Regional Medical Center, a U.S. Army installation atop the Kirchberg.

Notable people
 Aaron AltherrGerman-American baseball player
 Shawn BradleyGerman-American basketball player
 LeVar BurtonAmerican actor
 Shelley FKA DRAMAmerican musician
 David RouzerAmerican politician
 Franz von SickingenGerman knight
 Rob ThomasAmerican musician
 Reggie WilliamsAmerican football player

International relations

Landstuhl is twinned with:
  Pont-à-Mousson, France (1967)
  Bad Münster am Stein-Ebernburg, Germany (1998)

References

External links

 
  

 
Towns in Rhineland-Palatinate
1320s establishments in the Holy Roman Empire
American diaspora in Europe
Kaiserslautern (district)
Palatinate Forest
Populated places established in the 1320s